Bland may refer to: things that taste like nothing

Places
Bland, Missouri, a US city
Bland, Virginia, a US unincorporated community
Division of Bland, a former Australian Electoral Division
Bland Shire, a local government area in New South Wales, Australia
Bland County, Virginia, United States
Bland County, New South Wales, Australia

People
Bland (surname)
Bland baronets 
Bland Ballard, an 18th-century soldier from Kentucky

Other uses
Bland diet